Alan Richard Vint (November 11, 1944 – August 16, 2006) was an American character actor.

Vint was born in Tulsa, Oklahoma. He appeared in a number of supporting roles during the 1970s in films such as The McMasters (1970), Two-Lane Blacktop (1971), The Panic in Needle Park (1971), Welcome Home, Soldier Boys (1971), Unholy Rollers (1972), Badlands (1973), Macon County Line (1974), Earthquake (1974), Breakout (1975), Checkered Flag or Crash (1977) and The Lady in Red (1979).  He also made guest appearances on such television series as Centennial, Police Story, Emergency!, Hawaii Five-O, Adam-12, Lou Grant and Baretta.

Vint appeared in several films with his brother Jesse Vint. He was married to Susan Mullen and had three daughters — Kelly, Kate and Megan Vint, also actors. Vint and Mullen eventually divorced.

Film

Television

References

External links

1944 births
2006 deaths
Male actors from Tulsa, Oklahoma
American male film actors
American male television actors
20th-century American male actors